NIST-7 was the atomic clock used by the United States from 1993 to 1999. It was one of a series of Atomic Clocks  at the National Institute of Standards and Technology. Eventually, it achieved an uncertainty of 5 × 10−15. The caesium beam clock served as the nation's primary time and frequency standard during that time period, but it has since been replaced with the more accurate NIST-F1, a caesium fountain atomic clock that neither gains nor loses one second in 100 million years.

References

External links
 National Institute of Standards and Technology

National Institute of Standards and Technology
Atomic clocks